Phil De Luna is a Canadian materials scientist. He served as a director at the National Research Council Canada (NRC), heading the "Materials for Clean Fuels Challenge Program," a collaborative research program on Canadian-made clean energy technology. He was the youngest ever director of a research program at the NRC at the time of his appointment. De Luna's research focuses on decarbonization, particularly CO2 conversion, hydrogen, and artificial intelligence for materials science. He is a Clarivate Highly Cited Researcher, which ranks papers in the top 1% by field and publication year. His doctoral research, which identified new electrocatalytic materials for the conversion of carbon dioxide into renewable fuels and feedstocks, gained him a graduate Governor General's medal.

De Luna earned his Bachelor of Science (BSc) from the University of Windsor, his Master of Science (MSc) from the University of Ottawa and his doctorate (PhD) in materials science from the University of Toronto. In 2022, De Luna was appointed an adjunct professor in the Department of Materials Science & Engineering at the University of Toronto. He has also served at UC Berkeley as a visiting researcher. Also in 2022, De Luna published the book "Accelerated Materials Discovery: How to Use Artificial Intelligence to Speed Up Development" about using artificial intelligence and robotics to accelerate traditional experimental discovery methods for new materials development.

In May 2021, he was confirmed as the Green Party of Canada's nominee in the riding of Toronto—St. Paul's for the 2021 Canadian federal election. He lost to Liberal incumbent Minister Carolyn Bennett. Of Filipino descent, he has published extensively in Canadian media on integrating minorities into scientific research and the need for engagement between scientists and politics. He lives in Toronto with his partner, an operating room nurse at the Hospital for Sick Children. He holds a variety of board and fellowship positions and currently serves as an Expert, Sustainability at McKinsey & Company.

Selected awards and recognition
 2022 Globe and Mail Report on Business Changemaker 
 2021  College of New Scholars, Artists and Scientists, Royal Society of Canada
 2019 Forbes 30 Under 30

Selected publications

References

External links

 Podcast

Canadian people of Filipino descent
21st-century Canadian scientists
Canadian materials scientists
Green Party of Canada candidates for the Canadian House of Commons
1991 births
Living people
University of Windsor alumni
University of Ottawa alumni
Academic staff of the University of Toronto